Wellington Street is a one-way street located in Central and Sheung Wan, Hong Kong. Named after Arthur Wellesley, 1st Duke of Wellington, it stretches from Wyndham Street to Queen's Road Central. The two sides of street is a mosaic of old and new buildings. Varieties of trades can be found on the street level. Street markets can be found in the adjacent lanes.

Location
The street is located at the bottom of Victoria Peak on Hong Kong Island and next to Queen's Road Central which serves as one of the main roads through the central business district. Wellington Street ends westwards at the end of Central and the beginning of Sheung Wan (the border between Central and Sheung Wan is marked by Aberdeen Street).

History
The old Roman Catholic cathedral—the first Catholic church in Hong Kong—was built in 1843 at the junction of Pottinger Street and Wellington Street and was destroyed in a fire in 1859. It was rebuilt with iconic twin steeples at its facade. However, space constraints led to a different site being selected in the 1880s; this was located above Caine Road by the Glenealy Ravine. When construction on the Cathedral of the Immaculate Conception was completed 1888, the old Wellington Street cathedral was demolished.

Japanese prostitutes constituted the majority of Japanese residents of Hong Kong in the late 19th century, and there were 13 licensed Japanese brothels and 132 prostitutes in Hong Kong in 1901. These brothels were initially located in Central, mostly on Hollywood Road, Stanley Street and Wellington Street. They later moved to Wan Chai.

In the afternoon of December 15, 1941, during the Battle of Hong Kong, a stick Japanese bombs hit the junction of Old Bailey Street and Caine Road, the junction of Pottinger Street and Hollywood Road, Wellington Street and the Central Police Station. The bombing was part of a systematic bombardment of the Hong Kong Island's north shore that was launched on that day.

Features
The street houses many shops on ground level and offices above with some housing. Notable businesses in Wellington Street include restaurants such as Mak's Noodle, Yung Kee, Lin Heung Tea House and Tsui Wah Restaurant.

See also
 List of streets and roads in Hong Kong

References
FootnotesBibliography

External links

Google Maps of Wellington Street

Central, Hong Kong
Sheung Wan
Roads on Hong Kong Island